Bajgora (indefinite form in Albanian: Bajgorë, Serbian; Бајгора) is a village in Kosovo. Located in the municipality of Mitrovica. It is located in the south of the Kopaonik range. According to the 2011 census, it had 1,098 inhabitants, all Albanians. It is part of the region known as Shala e Bajgorës.

Bajgora was the scene of Kosovo Liberation Army activity during the Kosovo War of 1999.

Notes and references
Notes:

References:

External links
 Nona geographical profile

Kopaonik
Villages in Mitrovica, Kosovo